Cibber is a surname. Notable people with the surname include:

Caius Gabriel Cibber, Danish sculptor; father of Colley Cibber
Charlotte Cibber, English actress, playwright, novelist, autobiographer, and noted transvestite
Colley Cibber, British actor, playwright, and Poet Laureate; father of Charlotte and Theophilus Cibber
Susannah Maria Cibber, English singer and actress; wife of Theophilus Cibber
Theophilus Cibber, English actor, playwright and author